Tauras Tunyla  (born August 8, 1993 in Klaipėda city, Lithuania) is a Lithuanian racer. Trained by his father Gintaras Tunyla, he started karting from the age of 5 (in 1998). Tauras became a vice-champion of Lithuania in 2000, won his first Lithuanian championship in 2001 and is a five-time champion of Lithuania.

Early life and career

Tauras enjoyed cars at a very young age. According to his mother, he was a very energetic child and the car was the only place where he could stay calm. His father, a former kart racer himself, built a self-made kart and started training Tauras when he was five years of age.

The family did not have sufficient resources for quality and expensive racing equipment, coaches or mechanics. All the training was done by Tauras’ father. They both were improving an old Soviet type kart so the racer obtained good knowledge in mechanics at a relevantly young age.

Tauras showed very good results in Lithuanian and Baltic championships. He participated in about 100 races and won 72 of them.

Tauras joined a professional kart team in 2008 and started racing abroad. Unfortunately, his father had some disagreements with the team leader and young racer had to stop his professional career and leave the team.

After a four-year career break Tauras returned to the sport in 2013. He joined forces with professional PR manager, received his first moderate sponsorship, built a racing car and took part in an Autoplius Fast Lap race with Mazda Miata roadster.  He got into the Top 3 with comparatively low powered car (220 hp) in the unlimited power class.

Photography and video art

During the break in his racing career, Tauras stayed close to the car sports and observed it through the lens of the camera. Soon he became one a car sport photographer and film maker in Lithuania, working under TAT Designs brand. The list of his clients includes Lithuanian racers Dominykas Butvilas, Benediktas Vanagas as well as international brands: Opel, Nissan, BMW, Orlen and Statoil.

Career summary

References
1. Official Autoplius Fast Lap page, race results, retrieved March 2, 2014

2. Official racer's page taurastunyla.lt, retrieved March 2, 2014

External links 
 
 Autoplius Fast Lap
 TAT Designs

1993 births
Living people
Lithuanian racing drivers
Sportspeople from Klaipėda